Isaiah Zuber (born April 15, 1997) is an American football wide receiver and punt returner for the Las Vegas Raiders of the National Football League (NFL). He played college football at Kansas State and Mississippi State.

College career
Zuber began his collegiate career at Kansas State, redshirting as a freshman. He had 141 receptions, 1,532 receiving yards and 13 touchdowns over the next three seasons. After his redshirt junior year, he transferred to Mississippi State for his final season of eligibility. Zuber had 14 receptions for 211 yards and two touchdowns in his lone season at Mississippi State.

Professional career

New England Patriots
Zuber was signed by the New England Patriots as an undrafted free agent following the 2020 NFL Draft on April 25, 2020. He was waived by the team on July 26, 2020. but was re-signed by the Patriots on August 5, 2020. Zuber was waived on September 5, 2020, during final roster cuts, and signed to the practice squad the next day. He was elevated to the active roster on September 26 for the team's week 3 game against the Las Vegas Raiders, and made his NFL debut in the game. He reverted to the practice squad after the game on September 28, 2020. He was elevated again on October 5, October 17, 2020, and October 31, 2020 for the weeks 4, 6, and 8 games against the Kansas City Chiefs, Denver Broncos, and Buffalo Bills, and reverted to the practice squad again following each game. He signed a reserve/future contract on January 4, 2021. Zuber’s first touchdown reception came on August 29, 2021, in the preseason game against the Giants. On August 31, 2021, Zuber was waived by the Patriots.

San Francisco 49ers
On September 3, 2021, Zuber was signed to the San Francisco 49ers practice squad. He was released on September 14, 2021.

Cleveland Browns
Zuber was signed to the Cleveland Browns' practice squad on November 9, 2021. He was released on November 16, 2021.

New York Jets
On December 22, 2021, Zuber was signed to the New York Jets practice squad. He was released on December 30.

Houston Gamblers
Zuber was selected in the 13th round of the 2022 USFL Draft by the Houston Gamblers.

Las Vegas Raiders
On July 19, 2022, Zuber was signed by the Las Vegas Raiders. He was waived on August 30, 2022 and signed to the practice squad the next day. He signed a reserve/future contract on January 9, 2023.

References

External links
Kansas State Wildcats bio
Mississippi State Bulldogs bio
New England Patriots bio

1997 births
Living people
American football wide receivers
Kansas State Wildcats football players
Mississippi State Bulldogs football players
New England Patriots players
New York Jets players
People from Stone Mountain, Georgia
Players of American football from Georgia (U.S. state)
San Francisco 49ers players
Sportspeople from DeKalb County, Georgia
Houston Gamblers (2022) players